Annamputhur is a village panchayat in the Marakkanam block, Viluppuram district, Tamil Nadu, India. The panchayat is known for Srinidheeswarar temple and a huge Shivalinga that people of this area have had reconstructed with the help of the Archaeological Survey of India.

Villages in Viluppuram district